Mawsonia  may refer to:
 Mawsonia (fish), an extinct genus of prehistoric coelacanth fish which lived during the Cretaceous period
 Mawsonia (fungus), a genus of fungi within the family Lichinaceae